Foundational violence are acts of violence that create sovereignty, a process that often involves ethnic cleansing or even genocide. Fatma Müge Göçek writes:

References

Sources

Sovereignty
Violence